Clearing may refer to:

Arts and media
 Clearing (Fred Frith album), 2001
 Clearing (Hyd album), 2022
 The Clearing (film), a 2004 drama film
 The Clearing (EP), a 2006 EP by Weatherbox
 The Clearing (Sleep for Sleepers album), 2009
 The Clearing (Locrian album), 2011
 The Clearing (Homeland), an episode of the American television series Homeland
 The Clearing (podcast), a 2019 true crime podcast

Ecology
 Clearing (forest), a tract of land with few or no trees in the middle of a wooded area
 Clearing (geography), the process by which vegetation is permanently removed
 Deforestation, the clearing away of trees to make farmland

Economics and finance
 Clearing (finance), the process of settling a transaction after committing to it
 Market clearing, the matching of supply and demand via price movement

Other uses
 Clearing, Chicago, a community area in Illinois, U.S.
 The Clearing (Ellison Bay, Wisconsin), also known as The Clearing Folk School
 Clearing (telecommunications), the disconnecting of a call
 Yarn clearing, in textile industry
 Clearing, a practice in Scientology
 Clearing, a process used by the UK's Universities and Colleges Admissions Service (UCAS)

See also 
 Clear (disambiguation)
 Clearance (disambiguation)